LTPS or LTPs may refer to:

 Lawrence Township Public Schools, including Lawrence High School (New Jersey)
 Low-temperature polycrystalline silicon, a transistor type used in the flat-panel display industry
 Latitudinal Temperature Probe System, an instrument in the physics experiment Borexino
 Local Transport Plans in England
 Let the Peoples Sing international choir competition

See also

 LTP (disambiguation), for the singular of LTPs